Thirudesamalai or Thiruthiyamalai, is a village in Tiruchirappalli District in the Indian state of Tamil Nadu.

Geography 
The village is situated between the Kaveri River to the south and the Kolli Hills to the north.  
Musiri  - 15 km northwest
 Thuraiyur  - 19 km
 Mannachanallur - 15 km
 Peramangalam  - 10 km
 Moovanur  -  3 km
 Thandalai Puthur (T.Puthur) - 5 km
 Thiruchirapalli - 49 km
 Chennai (formerly known as Madras) - 300 km northeast

Culture 
Thirudesamalai is the site of the 5,000-year-old Hindu Eka Pushpa Priya Nathar Swamy Temple, which is dedicated to the god Shiva.

Governance 
Thirudesamalai is governed by a Panchayat along with the villages of Rayapatti, Palappatti, T.Mettupatti, Manali Ayithampatti, T. Ayyambalaiyam, Kollappatti, and Pachanampatti (Melur and Keelur) making up the voting body of Gram Sabha.

Health care 
 Government Hospital, Moovanur - 3 km
 Government Hospital, T.Puthur - 5 km
 Government Hospital, Trichy - 48 km

Education

Schools 
 Government High School, Thiruthiyamalai
 Government Higher Secondary School, T.Puthur
 Government Higher Secondary School, Moovanur

Colleges 
 Arignar Anna Government Arts College, Musiri
 Musiri Institute of technology, Musiri
 Government Polytechnic College, Trichy
 Sheshasayi Institute of Technology, Trichy
 Sri Angalamman Engineering College, Trichy
 Sri Jayaram College of Engineering, Karattam Patti
 Sudharsana Polytechnic College, Thuraiyur

Transport

Bus 
Government buses connect to Trichy, Musiri, Peramangalam, Thuraiyur, Pulivalam, Sirugambur, T.Puthur, and beyond. The nearest bus stands are Trichy, Musiri, and Thuraiyur.

Train 
The nearest railway station is Tiruchirappalli Junction (TPJ). No railroads reach from Trichy to Thiruthiyamalai.

Air 
The nearest airport is Tiruchirapalli International Airport (TRZ), located 48 km from Thiruthiyamalai.

References 

Villages in Tiruchirappalli district
Historic preservation in India
Architecture in India